Club Deportivo Santa Eugenia is a football club in a little ward named Santa Eugenia, in the famous working-class district Villa de Vallecas. Santa Eugenia are playing currently (2013–14) in Preferente.

History
In summer of 1974, many young boys lived in this new village, thought with all their neighbours, to create a football club. Finally, they built the team and they played their first Crespo Tournament in season 1974/75 and they began to play in Tercera Regional Ordinaria.

First year, CD Santa Eugenia played on home in an improvised terrain between Castrillo de Aza street and the railways. Next year, they built the actual pitch, with a bar, kiosko and two changing rooms. In 1976, they affiliated in the Castilian Football Association, with the number 1268.

In the 80/81 season, with Paco Valverde as manager, CD Santa Eugenia qualified for the Segunda de Aficionados. Eleven years later the club qualified again for the Primera de Aficionados and in the season 96/97 qualified for the Preferente, but in the season 05/06, was relegated in their actual division.

Season to season

0 seasons in Tercera División

Presidents

Uniform
 Home Uniform: Green shirt, white shorts and green shocks.
 Away Uniform: Yellow shirt, green shorts and yellow shocks.

Current squad

Low levels
 Infantil A
 Infantil B
 Benjamín
 Cadete A
 Juvenil

External links
Official website
futmadrid.com profile

Villa de Vallecas
Football clubs in Madrid
Divisiones Regionales de Fútbol clubs
Association football clubs established in 1974
1974 establishments in Spain